Nosate is a comune (municipality) in the Province of Milan in the Italian region Lombardy, located about  northwest of Milan.

Nosate borders the following municipalities: Lonate Pozzolo, Bellinzago Novarese, Castano Primo, Cameri.  In addition to Nosate, there are three villages in the municipality: Cascina del Ponte di Castano, Cascina Ponte di Castano, and Case sparse.   The eighth century church Santa Maria in Binda is found within the municipality's limits.

Demographic evolution

References

Cities and towns in Lombardy